Kees Junior Meeuws (born 26 July 1974) is a New Zealand former rugby union prop and former assistant coach of the Highlanders in the Super Rugby competition, and also a real estate agent by trade and a painter by education. Meeuws played 42 tests for the All Blacks between 1998 and 2004, scoring 10 test tries. He played provincial rugby for Otago and Auckland, and played for the Blues in the Super 12.
In 2004, Meeuws left New Zealand to take up a contract with French club Castres Olympique, and in 2006 he left Castres for Agen after a falling-out with Castres coach Laurent Seigne. Following Agen's relegation after the 2006–07 season, Meeuws left Agen and returned to Castres, signing a two-year contract with the club. In May 2008, it was announced that Meeuws would be joining the Scarlets on a two-year deal. However, shortly into his Scarlets career, he suffered a long-term injury. In July 2009, having made just 12 appearances and scored 1 try, his contract with the Scarlets was cancelled by mutual consent. He returned to Otago in 2010 to play in the ITM Cup.

Meeuws was born in Auckland of Dutch and Māori parentage. He has written an autobiographical book about his experiences in France, Le Rugbyman (co-written with Heather Kidd), published in 2005.

Meeuws has a long-standing interest in art, and has exhibited his own work (created in collaboration with David Burke) in 2011 and 2015. He was also an alumnus of Elam School of Fine Arts as part of University of Auckland.

In 2020, he is in the alumni Match Fit squad to face New Zealand Barbarians. He revealed that he lost his mother at age 10, and his father at 20.He returned in season 2 in 2021/22 as the most powerful, strongest and most explosive player in the team.

References

External links

Kees Meeuws (official website)
Scarlets profile

1974 births
Living people
New Zealand rugby union players
Auckland rugby union players
Rugby union props
New Zealand international rugby union players
New Zealand people of Dutch descent
Blues (Super Rugby) players
Highlanders (rugby union) players
Scarlets players
New Zealand Māori sportspeople
People educated at Rutherford College, Auckland
New Zealand expatriate sportspeople in Wales
Rugby union players from Auckland